The Melba Memorial Conservatorium of Music was a school of music located in Melbourne, Victoria, Australia. During its early days it was closely associated with opera diva Dame Nellie Melba, after whom it was later named. In 1994 it became affiliated with Victoria University. Founded in 1901 as the Conservatorium of Music, Melbourne, the Melba Conservatorium ceased teaching at the end of 2008. However,  the Melba Opera Trust continues to fund scholarships to help young opera singers develop their skills.

Early history 
The Melba was established as a private Conservatorium in 1901 after breaking away from the control of the University of Melbourne, where it had been founded in 1895. George William Louis Marshall Hall, its first proprietor, named his institution The Conservatorium of Music, Melbourne, and operated it initially within the Victorian Artists' Society Building in Albert Street, East Melbourne. The Conservatorium continued to function as a private Conservatorium with a Sole Proprietor through its second Director, Fritz Hart and on to its third Director, Harold Elvins.

When Elvins purchased the Conservatorium business he set about forming the Conservatorium into a nonprofit company. This was achieved in 1944 and the Melba has continued to run since that time as an incorporated company with a governing Council. Several further Directors and a change of premises for ten years to 16 Hoddle Street, Abbotsford, saw the Conservatorium, by 1983, purchase accommodation at 45 York Street, Richmond, where it remained until its closure in 2008.

Change of name 
Australia's famous diva, Dame Nellie Melba, associated herself closely with the Conservatorium, teaching here from 1915 until her death in 1931. Madame Melba prolonged her link with the Conservatorium after her death, through the provision of a generous bequest and it is her association with the Conservatorium which was responsible for the change of name of the institution, in 1956, to the Melba Memorial Conservatorium of Music.

Association with Victoria University 
Melba achieved recognition of its Diploma of Music through its affiliation in 1994 with Victoria University. Under this agreement, Melba delivered the University's Bachelor of Music courses. Melba also offered private studio tuition through its Single Studies program, and short courses.

In 2002, Melba commenced delivery of two new degree programs at the University's Sunbury campus, in a cross-sectoral Music Department, sharing facilities with Victoria University TAFE's School of Further Education, Arts and Employment Services. These BMus programs at Sunbury provide undergraduate courses in music technology and contemporary music performance.

Melba continued to produce classical and contemporary music performers and other music professionals well equipped to pursue a variety of careers at local community, national and international level. Students spent more than half of their course time in performance and/or studio related activities under the guidance of a small specialist staff, dedicated to providing students with a supportive and professional environment in which to learn and develop as musicians.

Closure and legacy 
After a little more than a century, the Melba Conservatorium ceased teaching at the end of 2008. However, it finds its continuing expression in the form of Melba Opera Trust.

Melba Opera Trust embodies precisely the same purposes and values that have sustained the Conservatorium for 108 years, nurturing young singers by supporting the development of young Australian opera singers with exceptional promise. On the closure of the Conservatorium, its assets were liquidated as a contribution to the capital base of the newly established Melba Opera Trust.

Ongoing scholarships

The Alfred Ruskin Memorial Award was established in 2004 and continues in perpetuity.

In 2012, the trust established the Harold Blair Opera Scholarship in honour of Aboriginal opera singer Harold Blair, to provide young Indigenous singers with artistic development, mentoring and performance opportunities. The inaugural scholarship was won by Tiriki Onus, who also won it in the following year.

Other scholarships include the Dame Nellie Melba Scholarship, Melba Opera Trust Scholarships, and others.

Patron 
The Patron of the Conservatorium was Dame Nellie Melba's granddaughter, Pamela, Lady Vestey.

Notable alumni
 Gertrude Johnson – soprano and founder of the National Theatre.
 Harold Blair – tenor and Aboriginal activist.
 Deirdre Cash – torch singer and novelist
 Louise Hanson-Dyer (née Smith) – pianist and founder of music publishing company Éditions de l'Oiseau-Lyre.
 Peggy Glanville-Hicks – composer
 George Dreyfus – composer
 Raja Ram (musician) - composer, founder TIP Records
 Christian O'Brien – composer and guitarist of indie pop band Alpine (band).

References

External links 
Official Website

Education in Melbourne
Music schools in Australia
Classical music in Australia
Victoria University, Melbourne
Nellie Melba